The Dunfee House, also known as the Dunfee Residence, in Syracuse, New York, was built in 1914.  Along with the Sanford House across the street and other Ward Wellington Ward-designed homes, it was listed on the National Register of Historic Places in 1997.

The house is listed for its architecture.

References

Houses in Syracuse, New York
National Register of Historic Places in Broome County, New York
Houses on the National Register of Historic Places in New York (state)
Houses completed in 1914